Indrek Teder (born 3 December 1957, Tallinn) is an Estonian lawyer and jurist.

From 2008 to 2015 he was the Chancellor of Justice of Estonia.

Biography 
He graduated from the University of Tartu, Faculty of Law in 1983, and joined the Estonian Bar Association in the same year.

He was a member of the Congress of Estonia.

He belongs to the Estonian Students' Society.

Decorations
2001: 4th Class of the Order of the White Star (received 23 February 2001)
2015: 3rd Class of the Order of the National Coat of Arms (received 23 February 2015)

References

1957 births
Living people
Ombudsmen in Estonia
20th-century Estonian lawyers
University of Tartu alumni
People from Tallinn
Recipients of the Order of the White Star, 4th Class
Recipients of the Order of the National Coat of Arms, 3rd Class
20th-century Estonian politicians
21st-century Estonian politicians
21st-century Estonian lawyers